Alejandro Gutiérrez Arango (born 2 January 1995) is a Colombian professional footballer who plays as a defender for Club Atlético Acassuso in the Primera B Metropolitana in Argentina.

Club career
Gutiérrez began his career in his homeland with hometown team Envigado, prior to sealing a move to Ferroválvulas. He soon switched Colombia for Argentina, joining Quilmes' youth ranks. In January 2016, Gutiérrez was loaned to Berazategui. He returned to Quilmes in June, though would rejoin Berazategui on loan in August. The Primera C Metropolitana outfit signed Gutiérrez permanently eleven months later. After spending 2017–18 there, taking his overall tally to thirty-six games and one goal, Gutiérrez joined Primera B Metropolitana's Deportivo Riestra on 16 July 2018. His bow didn't arrive until February versus San Miguel.

International career
Gutiérrez, whilst with Quilmes, received a call-up from the Colombia U20s.

Career statistics
.

References

External links

1995 births
Living people
People from Envigado
Colombian footballers
Association football defenders
Colombian expatriate footballers
Expatriate footballers in Argentina
Colombian expatriate sportspeople in Argentina
Primera C Metropolitana players
Primera B Metropolitana players
Quilmes Atlético Club footballers
A.D. Berazategui footballers
Deportivo Riestra players
Club Atlético Acassuso footballers
Sportspeople from Antioquia Department